Louis Van Geyt (24 September 1927 – 15 April 2016) was a Belgian politician.

Van Geyt was the last chairman of the Communist Party of Belgium, from 1972 to 1989. He was also the last MP of the party representing Brussels-Halle-Vilvoorde, from 1971 till the 1981 elections, and the last communist municipal councillor in the Brussels region (in the municipality of Brussels), till the 1982 elections.

References

Sources
A. Meynen, Van Praag 1948 tot Vilvoorde 1954: politiek-biografische gesprekken met Louis Van Geyt, Brussels, IMAVO-DACOB, 2001

1927 births
2016 deaths
Belgian communists
Politicians from Antwerp